A virtual network interface (VIF) is an abstract virtualized representation of a computer network interface that may or may not correspond directly to a network interface controller.

Operating system level
It is common for the operating system kernel to maintain a table of virtual network interfaces in memory.  This may allow the system to store and operate on such information independently of the physical interface involved (or even whether it is a direct physical interface or for instance a tunnel or a bridged interface).  It may also allow processes on the system to interact concerning network connections in a more granular fashion than simply to assume a single amorphous "Internet" (of unknown capacity or performance).

W. Richard Stevens, in volume 2 of his treatise
entitled TCP/IP Illustrated, refers to the kernel's Virtual Interface Table in his discussion of multicast routing. For example, a multicast router may
operate differently on interfaces that represent tunnels than on
physical interfaces (e.g. it may only need to collect membership information
for physical interfaces).  Thus the virtual interface may need to divulge some
specifics to the user, such as whether or not it represents a physical
interface directly.

In addition to allowing user space applications to refer to abstract network
interface connections, in some systems a virtual interface framework may allow
processes to better coordinate the sharing of a given physical interface
(beyond the default operating system behavior) by hierarchically subdividing it
into abstract interfaces with specified bandwidth limits and queueing models.
This can imply restriction of the process, e.g. by inheriting a limited branch
of such a hierarchy from which it may not stray.

This extra layer of network abstraction is often unnecessary, and may have a
minor performance penalty.  However, it is also possible to use such a
layer of abstraction to work around a performance bottleneck, indeed even to
bypass the kernel for optimization purposes.

Application level
The term VIF has also been applied when the application virtualizes or
abstracts network interfaces.  Since most software need not concern
itself with the particulars of network interfaces, and since the desired
abstraction may already be available through the operating system, this
usage is rare.

See also 
 Loopback
 Network virtualization
 Virtual Interface Architecture

References

External links
 Linux Network Interfaces

Computer networks